Mojen is a city in Bastam District, Shahrud County, Semnan Province, Iran. At the 2006 census, its population was 5,526, in 1,554 families.

References

Populated places in Shahrud County

Cities in Semnan Province